Gurinder Singh Josan CBE (Punjabi: ਗੁਰਿੰਦਰ ਸਿੰਘ ਜੋਸਨ; born August 1972) is an English businessman and Labour Party politician, who served on Sandwell Metropolitan Borough Council, and sits on Labour's National Executive Committee and the West Midlands' Strategic Policing and Crime Board.

He was elected to serve the St Paul's ward of Sandwell Metropolitan Borough in the 2002 Sandwell Metropolitan Borough Council election.

He is a trustee of the HOPE Not Hate charitable trust, a former trustee of the Guru Nanak Gurdwara, Smethwick, sits on the national executive of the Sikh Council UK and is a governor for three schools.

He was appointed a Commander of the Order of the British Empire (CBE) in the 2019 New Year Honours, "for political service".

He was elected to the National Executive Committee of the Labour Party in April 2020.

References 

1972 births
Living people
Place of birth missing (living people)
People from Smethwick
Labour Party (UK) councillors
Councillors in the West Midlands (county)
Commanders of the Order of the British Empire
School governors
Labour Party (UK) officials